This is an incomplete list of books about the September 11 attacks. In the first 10 years following the September 11, 2001 terrorist attacks, dozens of books were published about the attacks or about subtopics such as just the attacks on the World Trade Center towers in New York City, and more have been published since.

A number of publications have released their own rankings of books about 9/11. In September 2011, The Guardian provided a listing by three panelists of what they felt to be the 20 best. Five books were identified by another September 2011 review on TODAY. FiveBooks provides listings by experts including security analysts, investigative journalists and academics on the best books about the September 11 attacks.

Fiction
Novels include:
Architect of Courage, 2022 novel by American author Victoria Weisfeld
Between Two Rivers, 2004 novel by American author Nicholas Rinaldi 
Bleeding Edge, 2013 detective story novel by American author Thomas Pynchon
Eleven, 2006 novel by Welsh David Llewellyn
The Emperor's Children, 2006 novel by American author Claire Messud
Extremely Loud and Incredibly Close, 2005 novel by American author Jonathan Safran Foer, which led to the film adaptation Extremely Loud & Incredibly Close (2011 film)
The Faithful Spy, 2006 Edgar award-winning mystery fiction first novel by Alex Berenson
Falling Man, 2007 novel by Don DeLillo
The Garden of Last Days, 2008 novel by American Andre Dubus III 
The Good Life, 2006 novel by American Jay McInerney
The Good Priest's Son: A Novel by Reynolds Price
The Immensity of the Here and Now: A Novel of 9.11, 2003 novel by Paul West
The Immortalists, 2018 New York Times #1 bestseller novel by Chloe Benjamin
The Loose Ends Saga, 2016 science fiction novel by Paul Levinson
The Man Who Wouldn't Stand Up, Dundee International Book Prize-winning 2012 first novel by American Jacob M. Appel
A Manhã do Mundo, (literally The Morning of the World), 2011 first novel by Portuguese writer Pedro Guilherme-Moreira
The Memory of Things, 2016 novel by American author Gae Polisner
The Ones We Keep, 2022 novel by Canadian-American author Bobbie Jean Huff
My Year of Rest and Relaxation, 2018 novel by American author Ottessa Moshfegh
Nine, Ten: A September 11 Story, 2016 novel by American author Nora Raleigh Baskin 
Saturday, 2005 "post 9/11" novel by English writer Ian McEwan
The Submission, 2011 novel by Amy Waldman
Sunrise Over Fallujah, 2008 novel by American author Walter Dean Myers
Towers Falling, 2016 novel by American author Jewell Parker Rhodes 
Truthers, 2017 YA novel by Geoffrey Girard
United States of Banana, 2011 dramatic novel by Giannina Braschi
We All Fall Down, 2007 novel by Eric Walters
Windows on the World, 2003 novel by Frédéric Beigbeder 
The Writing on the Wall, 2005 novel by Lynne Sharon Schwartz
The Zero, 2006 novel by Jess Walter
False Impression, 2005 novel by Jeffrey Archer

Graphic novels include:
In the Shadow of No Towers, 2004, by Art Spiegelman
Can't Get No, 2006, by Rick Veitch
American Widow, 2008, by Alissa Torres
United States of Banana, 2017, by Joakim Lindengren and Giannina Braschi

Short stories include:
"The Things They Left Behind," 2003, by Stephen King (according to the afterword in his anthology Just After Sunset, King was prompted to write a 9/11 story after facing criticism from a friend for writing about The Holocaust in an earlier story when he had not experienced it himself)
"The Mutants," 2004, by Joyce Carol Oates
"Ground Zero," 2005, by Patrick McGrath
"The Last Days of Muhammad Atta," 2006 by Martin Amis

Collections of poetry and/or short stories include:
110 Stories: New York Writes after September 11, 2001, 2004, edited by Ulrich Baer
In the Shadow of the Towers: Speculative Fiction in a Post-9/11 World, 2015, edited by Douglas Lain

Non-fiction

Reviews of literature
Reviews of fiction and other literature include:
Within and Without the Metropolis: Foreground and Background in Post-9/11 Literature, by Alexandru Oravițan, West University of Timișoara Press, 2019

After the Fall, by Richard Gray, Wiley–Blackwell, 2011
Out of the Blue: September 11 and the Novel, by Kristiaan Versluys, Columbia University Press, 2009
Literature after 9/11, edited by Ann Keniston and Jeanne Follansbee Quinn, Routledge, 2008
Trauma Culture: The Politics of Terror and Loss in Media and Literature, by E. Ann Kaplan, Rutgers University Press, 2005
Trauma at Home: After 9/11, by Judith Greenberg, University of Nebraska Press, 2003
110 Stories: New York Writes After September 11, by Ulrich Baer, New York University Press, 2002

Memoirs and first-hand accounts
American Widow, 2008 graphic memoir by Alissa Torres, widow of the 9/11 attacks, drawn by Sungyoon Choi
In My Time: A Personal and Political Memoir, 2011 memoir by former Vice President of the United States Dick Cheney with Elizabeth Cheney, including Cheney's version of 9/11
 Unmeasured Strength, 2011 memoir by 9/11 survivor Lauren Manning.

Collections of essays and/or articles
Small Wonder, 2002 collection of 23 essays by American novelist and biologist Barbara Kingsolver
With Every Mistake, 2005 collection of Canadian Gwynne Dyer's articles published between September 11, 2001 and the Iraqi election in 2005.
In Representing 9/11: Trauma, Ideology, and Nationalism in Literature, Film, and Television, scholars from a variety of disciplines demonstrate how emergent American and international texts expand upon and complicate the initial post-9/11 canon.

Other nonfiction
Nonfiction books include:
102 Minutes: The Untold Story of the Fight to Survive Inside the Twin Towers
9/11 And The Art Of Happiness
9/11: The Big Lie
9-11
Aftermath: World Trade Center Archive
American Ground
At the Center of the Storm
Breakdown: How America's Intelligence Failures Led to September 11
The CIA and September 11 (book)
The Day the World Came to Town
Debunking 9/11 Myths
Fall and Rise: The Story of 9/11
In My Time: A Personal and Political Memoir
In the Shadow of No Towers
Known and Unknown: A Memoir
The Little Chapel That Stood
Longitudes and Attitudes
The New Patriotism Series
The New Pearl Harbor
The Only Plane in the Sky: An Oral History of 9/11
State of War: The Secret History of the CIA and the Bush Administration
Terror and Liberalism
The Terror Timeline
The Trigger: The Lie That Changed the World
Welcome to the Desert of the Real
With Every Mistake
The War on Terror: The Plot to Rule the Middle East.

See also
List of comics about the September 11 attacks
List of cultural references to the September 11 attacks

References

September 11 attacks
Books about the September 11 attacks
September 11 attacks
September 11 attacks in popular culture